Sundaroa is a genus of tussock moths in the family Erebidae. The genus was erected by Jeremy Daniel Holloway in 1999.

Species
The following species are included in the genus:
Sundaroa calesia Swinhoe, 1902
Sundaroa celaenostola Collenette, 1932
Sundaroa cheyi Holloway, 1999
Sundaroa flaveofusca Swinhoe, 1902
Sundaroa mirma Swinhoe, 1903
Sundaroa sexmacula Swinhoe, 1903
Sundaroa transflava Holloway, 1976

References

Lymantriinae
Moth genera